Radio Vitosha is a radio station based in Sofia, Bulgaria. It was founded in the late 90s and remains one of the most popular in the country. The station was the first in Bulgaria to make a morning show, "Тройка на Разсъмване" (The Three At Dawn). Later, several other station copied the idea, but Vitosha's trio of presenters are still popular due to the variety of subjects they covers. Since 2007, the motto of Radio Vitosha is музиката която те кара да се раздвижиш (The music that makes you move). The station's main office is located on Srebarna street, near the Sofia Zoo.

Frequencies:

Sofia, Pernik 97.6 MHz,  

Plovdiv, Pazardzhik, 97.0 MHz, 

Varna 92.6 MHz, 

Burgas 96.7 MHz, 

Vidin 95.8 MHz

Sevlievo 90.6 MHz

Pleven 106.1 MHz

Dobrich 96.6 MHz

Silistra 105.8 MHz

Blagoevgrad, Dupnitsa 93.6 MHz

Petrich, Sandanski 94.1 MHz

Smolyan 90.9 MHz

Kardzhali 106.5 MHz

Svilengrad, Haskovo, Stara Zagora 97.6 MHz

Sliven, Yambol 106.4 MHz

External links 

Radio Vitosha at LyngSat Address

References 

Radio stations in Bulgaria
ProSiebenSat.1 Media
Mass media in Sofia